NDK II is a Sofia Metro station on M3 line. It was opened on 26 August 2020 as part of the inaugural section of the line, from Hadzhi Dimitar to Krasno Selo. The station is located between St. Patriarch Evtimiy and Medical University. Transfer to NDK on M2 line is available.

Location 
The station is serving the National Palace of Culture.

References

Sofia Metro stations
2020 establishments in Bulgaria
Railway stations opened in 2020